The Rwenzori Times (abbreviated as RT) is an independent, first ever and biggest news website and magazine in Rwenzori region. The news website and magazine are owned and published by the Rwenzori Times Media Limited, with  its offices and printing on Stanley Street, in  the Central Town of Kasese, Uganda.

The Rwenzori Times magazine which was first launched in May 2016 has the second-largest circulation, behind The Independent Magazine - Uganda, and the largest circulation among the districts of Rwenzori with over 10,000 copies being sold daily.

The Rwenzori Times is ranked 1st in Rwenzori by online readership with more than 1,000,000 online readers across the world.

Location
The head office of The Rwenzori Times and the Rwenzori Times Media Limited, is located at Plot 21, Stanley Street (Rwenzori Road) in the Central Town of Kasese, Uganda's second largest industrial city.

See also
 List of newspapers in Uganda
 Media in Uganda

References

External links
Official Website
List of Online Newspapers In Uganda

Rwenzori Times
Rwenzori Times
Rwenzori Mountains
Rwenzori Times
Rwenzori Times